(Foochow Romanized: Hók-ăng-chê; sometimes Fu An) is a county-level city of Ningde prefecture level city, in northeast Fujian province, PRC, some  away from the provincial capital Fuzhou.

History

Found 
Fu'an county was found in 1245 AD in the Southern Song.

Modern 
In civil war of China, Fu'an was occupied by People's Liberation Army on July, 1949. 
In November 1989,  Fu'an county was abolished, at the same time Fu'an city was established.

Geography 
Fu'an is surrounded by hills and the sea.

Climate

Demographics

By December of 2021, Fu'an has 676,624 residents. With 199031 households. 

Fu'an City is mainly composed of three ethnic groups: Han Chinese, She and Hui. The She population accounts for about 11% of the city's population, and the Han population accounts for about 88.4% of the total population. The Han include the Tanka people of which there currently  are about 7,400.

Fu'an dialect in Eastern Min is commonly spoken in the city, whereas She people use She language. 

The major religion in Fu'an city is Buddhism. Taoism and other Chinese folk beliefs are also popular. Catholic and Protestant believers accounts for 14% of the total population. There are 47 Roman Catholic and protestant churches around the city.

Economy
Fu'an is known for its tea production. One successful local company is the Tan Yang Kunfu tea, which won the gold medal in Panama Pacific International Exposition (Year 1915).

Besides tea, the agricultural sector is specialized in grapes, aquaculture and animal husbandry.

The three leading industries in Fu'an are the electrical machinery industry, the shipbuilding industry and the food industry  . There are more than 730 electrical machinery companies, 84 shipping companies, and more than 800 food processing companies. The main food crops in mountainous and hilly areas are double-season rice and sweet potato. In addition, a variety of economic crops are also planted in coastal plains and valley basins, mainly sugarcane, grapes, edible mushrooms, tea, peaches, bamboo, as well as aquaculture.

Education
One of the first Anglo-Chinese kindergartens was established in Fu'an in 2002.

Transport

Road

 China National Highway 104
 China National Highway 228
 G15 Shenyang–Haikou Expressway
 G1523 Yongguan Expressway
 G1514 Ningde–Shangrao Expressway
 G4012 Lining Expressway

Water
Fu'an is located on the middle stream of the Jiao River, the main tributary of the Baima River.

Fu'an is known for the Baima Harbor(白馬港）, which also bears the name "Golden Passage".

Railway 

Administration

Fu'an has 4 street committees; the city's executive, legislature and judiciary are in Chengnan, together with its CPC and PSB branches. The city has 13 towns and 5 townships, of which three are zoned Affirmative action-like for the She nation natives.

Subdistricts

 Chengbei
 Chengnan
 Yangtou
 Luojiang

Towns

 Muyang
 Shangbaishi
 Xitan
 Xiabaishi
 Saiqi
 Xiwei
 Shekou
 Tantou
 Xiaoyang
 Xibing
 Gantang
 Chengyang
 Wanwu

Townships and Ethnic Townships

 Songluo
 Fankang

 Kangcuo She
 Muyun She
 Banzhong She

Notable people
 Saint Francis Ferdinand de Capillas, who was martyred here

See also
 Ningde
 Fujian
 Wenzhou

References

External links

Ningde government website

 
County-level divisions of Fujian
Cities in Fujian
Ningde